Dark Journey is a 1937 British spy film directed by Victor Saville and starring Conrad Veidt and Vivien Leigh. Written by Lajos Bíró and Arthur Wimperis, the film is about two secret agents on opposite sides during World War I who meet and fall in love in neutral Stockholm.

It was shot at Denham Studios, with sets designed by the art director Andrej Andrejew assisted by Ferdinand Bellan. The film's costumes were by René Hubert.

Plot
In the spring of 1918, a German U-boat stops a Dutch freighter on its way to Stockholm, Sweden during the final year of World War I. The Germans board the ship, identify one man as a Belgian spy, and take him prisoner. One of the passengers questioned is an attractive Swiss dress shop owner named Madeleine Goddard (Vivien Leigh) who is returning to Stockholm from a business trip to Paris, where she purchased dresses for her boutique. After returning to Stockholm, Madeleine, who is a German spy, meets with her contacts and provides information on Allied troop movements she acquired in Paris. The information is cleverly concealed in the gowns she purchased. While the Germans believe that she is one of their top spies, Madeleine is in fact a French double agent working to uncover the identity of the new German secret service leader in Stockholm.

Soon after, a German war veteran named Baron Karl Von Marwitz (Conrad Veidt) enters Sweden. He claims to have left the German Navy because of war injuries, but some of his former colleagues believe he is a deserter. One night, Madeleine goes to a nightclub accompanied by her friend, English MI6 agent Bob Carter (Anthony Bushell). She notices Von Marwitz playing a bar room game predicting what girls will say after he kisses them. After she exposes the trick, Von Marwitz becomes intrigued by Madeleine's beauty and cool demeanor. The next day he visits her shop with Lupita (Joan Gardner), the Brazilian socialite he tricked the previous evening. After the temperamental Lupita leaves, Von Marwitz begins asking Madeleine to go out with him. In the coming days, she continues to refuse his requests, even after he offers to purchase all the stock in her shop. When he finally gives up, she gives in and agrees to date him.

Madeleine and Von Marwitz begin seeing each other socially, and despite their differences, they fall deeply in love. Von Marwitz even proposes marriage. Their whirlwind romance is interrupted one night when Madeleine's German co-conspirator, Anatole Bergen, is murdered. Madeleine meets with her German contacts who inform her that the recent information she provided proved disastrous for the German Army. She is ordered to return to Paris immediately and investigate her French contacts. When Madeleine reaches Paris, she is met by a high-ranking French official who presents her with the Médaille militaire for her brave service to her country. Despite her reluctance to continue her work in Stockholm, she is ordered to return.

Back in Stockholm, Madeleine and Von Marwitz are reunited and she reveals that she knows he is the German secret service leader. In response, he reveals that he knows that she is in fact a French spy. Although relieved that they can finally speak honestly with each other, they acknowledge that their dream of a life together can never happen. Soon after, Madeleine turns to her friend Bob for protection, now that her true identity is known to the Germans. While Bob plans her escape from Stockholm and the Germans, Von Marwitz plans her capture and return to Germany. The next day, Bob arranges for Madeleine to be arrested by the Stockholm police, ruining Von Marwitz's plan to capture her quietly.

After Madeleine is deported, her ship is stopped by a German U-boat in neutral waters. Von Marwitz boards the ship and arrests Madeleine for being a French spy. As they are being rowed from the ship to the U-boat, a British Q-ship (a heavily armed merchant ship with concealed weaponry) approaches and engages the U-boat in battle, sinking the enemy vessel. Madeleine is taken aboard the Q-ship while von Marwitz is moved to a British destroyer. Her feelings of love unabated, Madeleine is assured that von Marwitz will not be shot, but instead will be detained until the end of the war. As von Marwitz is rowed away, Madeleine waves and calls out to him, "I'll be waiting."

Cast

 Conrad Veidt as Von Marwitz
 Vivien Leigh as Madeleine
 Joan Gardner as Lupita
 Anthony Bushell as Bob Carter
 Ursula Jeans as Gertrude
 Margery Pickard as Colette
 Eliot Makeham as Anatole
 Austin Trevor as Dr. Muller
 Sam Livesey as Schaffer
 Edmund Willard as Chief of German Intelligence
 Charles Carson as Head of Fifth Bureau

 Phil Ray as Faber
 Henry Oscar as Swedish Magistrate
 Lawrence Hanray as Cottin
 Cecil Parker as Captain of Q-Boat
 Reginald Tate as Mate of Q-Boat
 Percy Walsh as Captain of Swedish Packet
 Robert Newton as Officer of U-boat
 William Dewhurst as The Killer
 Laidman Browne as Rugge
 M. Martin Harvey as Bohlau
 Anthony Holles as Dutchman

Soundtrack
The music was composed by Richard Addinsell and orchestrated by Roy Douglas and Lionel Salter. The musical director was Muir Mathieson.

Reception
Writing for The Spectator in 1937, Graham Greene gave the film a poor review, parodying Dante's warning with a warning for viewers to "Abandon life all ye who enter here" and asking readers what the film is about because it "certainly [does] not [reflect] life". Greene noted that director Saville is capable of good films, but claimed that this time he had been "defeated by the incredible naïvety of [the] script".

References

External links
 
 
 

1937 films
1930s romance films
1930s spy films
1930s war films
British black-and-white films
British romance films
British spy films
British war films
Films directed by Victor Saville
Films produced by Alexander Korda
Films produced by Victor Saville
Films scored by Richard Addinsell
Films set in 1918
Films set in Paris
Films set in Stockholm
Films set in the Baltic Sea
Films shot at Denham Film Studios
London Films films
Seafaring films
War romance films
World War I spy films
1930s English-language films
1930s British films